George Leopold Langdon (11 February 1818 – 2 January 1894) was an English cricketer. Langdon was a left-handed batsman. He was born at Winchester, Hampshire.

Langdon made his first-class cricket debut for Sussex against the Marylebone Cricket Club at Lord's Cricket Ground on 10 June 1839, in what was Sussex County Cricket Club's inaugural first-class match. Making the majority of his career first-class appearances in 1839, he appeared in four further matches for Sussex in that season. He also appearance twice for the Marylebone Cricket Club in that season, as well as once for the Gentlemen of Sussex against the Marylebone Cricket Club, as well as appearing once for a combined Sussex and Nottinghamshire team against England. He appeared in two first-class matches for Sussex in 1840 against England and Nottinghamshire, as well as appearing for England against Kent. The following season he made two first-class appearances for the Gentlemen against the Players, as well as a single first-class match for Sussex against the Marylebone Cricket Club. In total, he made fifteen first-class appearances, eight of which came for Sussex. He scored 130 runs for the county, at an average of 9.28 and with a high score of 38. Overall, he scored 224 runs at an average of 8.00, with a high score of 38.

Outside of cricket, he was an Anglican priest, with his final parish being St Paul's Cray, Kent, where he died on 2 January 1894.

References

External links

1818 births
1894 deaths
Cricketers from Winchester
English cricketers
Sussex cricketers
Marylebone Cricket Club cricketers
Gentlemen cricketers
19th-century English Anglican priests
English cricketers of 1826 to 1863
Gentlemen of Sussex cricketers
Non-international England cricketers